Pweto Airport  is an airport serving Pweto, a town in the Democratic Republic of the Congo. Pweto is on the northernmost corner of Lake Mweru, and on the border with Zambia.

It is new, replacing the previous dirt runway to the west of Pweto.

It was built by Australian company Mawson West in 2012–2013 to serve its proposed copper mine to the east at Kapulo. After construction of the runway, Mawson put the mining plans on hold due to low copper prices, and was subsequently acquired and taken private.

See also

Transport in the Democratic Republic of the Congo
List of airports in the Democratic Republic of the Congo

References

Airports in Haut-Katanga Province